St. Aloysius Minor Seminary is the first minor seminary of the Syro-Malankara Catholic Church in Trivandrum, Kerala, India.  It is situated at Kesavadasapuram, Trivandrum. This Seminary was founded by the founder of the reunion movement Servant of God Archbishop Mar Ivanios on 21 June 1934, on the feast of St. Aloysius Gonzaga. The seminary started working in a temporary building adjacent to the Little Flower Parish Church, Pattom. In 1938 the seminary was shifted to the Archbishop Mar Ivanios’ residence. The seminary remained at St. Marys Cathedral Compound for a long time. From 2007 this seminary has been shifted to different places due to various reasons and this year (2016) this seminary is shifted to its present building which was used as the clergy home for retired priests. 
The Minor Seminary course extends for a period of four years. Some join the seminary after their secondary school education and others after Higher Secondary Schools. Those completed the Higher Secondary school education have to spend two years in this institute and others four years. Students have a regimented life, which includes daily masses and prayer, academics and recreation. The studies encompass the regular Higher Secondary education, Church History, Catechism, Liturgy, Spiritual Life, and language studies especially Syriac, English and Malayalam. Needless to say, regular confession, spiritual direction and spiritual conferences hold a prominent position in the routine of the seminary. In short, the entire programme of our minor seminary has for its goal the preparation of young men for the major seminary. After the successful completion of minor seminary formation, the students are sent to different major seminaries in India for philosophical studies for a period of three years. Subsequently, a whole year is dedicated for practical training called Regency period. After that, they are sent to St. Mary’s Malankara Major Seminary (the only major seminary for the entire Syro-Malankara Catholic Church) for their theological formation that lasts for four years. In short, the priestly formation in the Syro-Malankara Catholic Church extends for a period of 12 years. 
So far more than 500 candidates who completed their formation in the St. Aloysius Minor Seminary have been ordained to priesthood. At present there are 42 minor seminarians and 19 philosophy students, 7 regents and 18 theology students.  A total of 86 candidates undergoing their priestly formation for the Major Archdiocese of Trivandrum.

Seminaries and theological colleges in India